Robert Lee Metcalf (November 13, 1916 – November 11, 1998) was an American entomologist, environmental toxicologist, and insect chemical ecologist.

Metcalf was noted for making environmentally safe pest control achievable.

Metcalf was a member of the National Academy of Sciences,
a fellow of the American Academy of Arts and Sciences,
a member of National Research Council,
a fellow and president of the Entomological Society of America.
He was a member of Environmental Protection Agency's Pesticide Advisory Panel.
The National Center for Biotechnology Information called Metcalf "one of the leading entomologists of the 20th century".
The National Academies Press called him the twentieth century most influential entomologist.
The University of Florida called him "a brilliant scientist and educator".

Notable awards and distinctions
Order of Cherubini, University of Pisa, Italy, 1966
Charles T. Spencer Award, American Chemical Society, 1966
Chancellor's Award for Excellence in Research, University of California, Riverside, 1967
International Award, Pesticide Chemistry, American Chemical Society, 1972
Meritorious Service Award, American Mosquito Association, 1976
Ciba Geigy Award of the Entomological Society of America, 1977
Memorial Lecture Award of the Entomological Society of America, 1978
Honorary Member, Entomological Society of America, 1979
School of Life Sciences, University of Illinois, Distinguished Lectureship Award, 1979
Founders' Award, Society for Environmental Chemistry and Toxicology, 1983

Life and career
Metcalf was born in Columbus, Ohio.
He received bachelor's and master's degrees from University of Illinois in 1939 and 1940, respectively.
He received his Ph.D. degree from Cornell University in 1942.
Metcalf join the faculty of the University of California, Riverside in 1948.
He moved to the University of Illinois in 1968.
As his son, I must add that he was a wonderful father.

References

1916 births
1998 deaths
American entomologists
Chemical ecologists
University of California, Riverside faculty
University of Illinois faculty
University of Illinois alumni
Cornell University alumni
Members of the United States National Academy of Sciences
People from Columbus, Ohio
American toxicologists
20th-century American zoologists
Presidents of the Entomological Society of America